Clare Loveday (born 22 March 1967) is a South African contemporary classical music composer.

She studied at the University of the Witwatersrand in Johannesburg, and has worked as a professional pianist, a composer for the South African advertising industry, and co-ordinator for the National Research Foundation's Travelling Institute for Music Research. Loveday has also worked as a lecturer in music theory and composition at the University of the Witwatersrand. She was composer in residence at the 2014 Johannesburg International Mozart Festival.

Biography
After having graduated from University of the Witwatersrand with a bachelor's degree in Music, Loveday landed a career for a few advertising companies, two of which are Standard Bank and South African Broadcasting Corporation. She returned to school in the late 1990s, and became a part-time lecturer. Once she achieved her master's degree in Music Composition, she started to collaborate with other artists and compose her own music and is most known for her saxophone pieces. 
Clare Loveday then became a full-time lecturer at Wits University, while working towards her doctorate in Music Composition. She has been commissioned by several organisations like "The South African Music Rights Organization" and many more. Although Loveday has worked her talents towards music composition, she has turned her career into a broader spectrum of music, including collaborations, research and teaching.

Orchestral works
 Blink (2007) for two saxophones and chamber orchestra
 Duodectet (2008) for saxophone orchestra
 Concerto for alto saxophone and chamber orchestra (2009)
 Three portraits of intimacy: a concerto for piano and chamber orchestra (2014)

Chamber music
 Wind-Play (2000) for soprano saxophone and piano 
 Palimpsest (2001) for alto saxophone and organ 
 Three-Piece Suite (2001) for clarinet quintet 
 Breath (2004) for alto saxophone and piano
 Displacement (2005) for alto saxophone and piano
 3 Excursions (2005) for saxophone quartet
 Untitled (2006) for saxophone quartet
 Charlie (2008) for clarinet, violin and cello
 Duodectet for Octet (2010) for eight saxophones
 Judgement Call (2010) for soprano and tenor saxophones
 Just So (2011) for B-flat clarinet and piano
 Just a Bite (2011) for alto saxophone and piano
 Paso Doble (2011) for saxophone ensemble and trumpet
 Hoar Frost (2011) for marimba and vibraphone
 Ribbons (2013) for oboe, viola and bass clarinet
 Fever Tree (2013) for flute, oboe, clarinet, marimba, piano, violin, viola and cello
 Eight Plus One (2014) for flute, B-flat clarinet, trumpet in C, trombone, piano, violin, viola and cello
 48 km North-West of Kokstad (2014) for alto saxophone and guitar

Solo instrumental
 Red Herring (2006) for alto saxophone
 Arc (2007) for baritone saxophone 
 Floating Underwater series (2010) for solo soprano birbynė (also suitable for B-flat clarinet or soprano saxophone) 
 It (2012), renamed Johannesburg Prelude 1, for solo piano
 Star-rise (2013) for solo flute
 South View (2013) for loboe (a new oboe with a low A)
 Cycles (2014), performance and installation for solo violin and hanging installation (collaboration with artist Nandipha Mntambo)

Vocal
 Dream (2000) for soprano and piano
 Pure (2000) for soprano, piano and clarinet
 So Vast (2001) for soprano and plucked piano strings
 Empty (2001) for soprano and piano
 Scattering Ashes (2011) for 7-part vocal group, soprano saxophone and marimba
 Noupoort (2011) for choir and marimba

Dramatic Works
 The Collision Project (2006) Art installation/theatre work/concert piece for car wreck and attached string parts (collaboration with scenographer Gerhard Marx)

References

External links
 Clare Loveday's webpage 
 Daily Maverick interview 
 Loboe Project profile of Clare Loveday 
 NewMusicSA biography of Clare Loveday 
 Profiled in the Juilliard Journal 
 Interview about residency at Johannesburg International Mozart Festival 
 Clare Loveday's Biography 

21st-century classical composers
South African composers
Living people
People from Johannesburg
University of the Witwatersrand alumni
Women classical composers
1967 births
21st-century women composers